The Asylum Tour was a concert tour by American rock band Kiss, in support of their thirteenth studio album, Asylum.

Background
On April 3, 1986, the band was set to perform in the Civic Arena in Pittsburgh, when a transformer ended up blowing out the lights two hours before the show, cancelling the performance that night and later rescheduled to April 12.

Tommy Thayer, a future member of Kiss, who was in Black 'n Blue at the time, had impressed Simmons when his band had opened for Kiss.

In the tour program for the band's final tour, Stanley reflected on the tour:

Reception
Jerry Spangler, a reporter from the Deseret News who attended the Salt Palace performance, stated that the show was another typical Kiss show, criticizing how little there was regarding talent and excitement. He commented that when they take away the special effects, that Kiss was referred to as a dinosaur; concluding that the band should have closed their doors a long time ago, while also noting on the opening act W.A.S.P.'s performance in more paragraphs. Boyd Rogers, a reader who had attended the performance, later sent a response to the reporter to criticize him, and defending the band's performance, stating the number of people attending the concert; noting also on how short the paragraphs were regarding the band - suggesting that the reporter close his 'carnival doors'.

Setlists
These are example setlists of what were performed during the tour, but may not represent the majority of the shows.

1985 Setlist
 "Detroit Rock City"
 "Fits Like a Glove"
 "Cold Gin"
 "Uh! All Night" (with Paul Stanley guitar solo)
 "War Machine" (with Eric Carr drum solo)
 "I Still Love You"
 "Under the Gun" (with Bruce Kulick guitar solo)
 "Tears Are Falling"
 "I Love It Loud" (with Gene Simmons bass solo)
 "Love Gun"
 "Rock and Roll All Nite"
Encore
  "Heaven's on Fire"
 "Won't Get Fooled Again"
 "Lick It Up"

1986 Setlist
 "Detroit Rock City"
 "Fits Like a Glove"
 "Creatures of the Night"
 "Cold Gin" (with Bruce Kulick guitar solo)
 "Uh! All Night"
 "War Machine" (with Eric Carr drum solo)
 "Love Gun"
 "I Still Love You"
 "I Love It Loud" (with Gene Simmons bass solo)
 "Heaven's on Fire" (with Paul Stanley guitar solo)
 "Rock and Roll All Nite"
Encore
  "Tears Are Falling"
 "Lick It Up"

Tour dates

 Paul Stanley dedicated the Tucson, Arizona concert at the McKale Center to the astronauts that were killed in the Space Shuttle Challenger explosion.
 The power went out in the middle of "Rock and Roll All Nite", ending the performance early.
 Local church groups protested the entire show due to its being scheduled on Easter Sunday.
 Opening act King Kobra was invited and appeared on stage to sing "Lick it Up" with Kiss, making King Kobra the first group to ever share the stage with Kiss.

Box office score data

Personnel 
 Paul Stanley – vocals, rhythm guitar
 Gene Simmons – vocals, bass
 Eric Carr – drums, backing vocals
 Bruce Kulick – lead guitar, backing vocals

References

Sources

Kiss (band) concert tours
1985 concert tours
1986 concert tours